Biella Cathedral is a Roman Catholic cathedral in Biella, Piedmont, Italy, dedicated to Saint Stephen. It is the episcopal seat of the Diocese of Biella.

See also 
Catholic Church in Italy

References 

Roman Catholic cathedrals in Italy
Cathedrals in Piedmont
Churches in the province of Biella
Religious buildings and structures in Biella